Mukařov is a municipality and village in Mladá Boleslav District in the Central Bohemian Region of the Czech Republic. It has about 200 inhabitants.

Administrative parts
Villages of Borovice and Vicmanov are administrative parts of Mukařov.

Geography
It lieson the border of the Jizera Table and Jičín Uplands. The Zábrdka Stream flows through the municipality.

History
The first written mention of Mukařov is from 1352. Mukařov, Borovice and Vicmanov were all founded during the colonization by Cistercian monks from the monastery in nearby Klášter Hradiště nad Jizerou.

Sights
The Church of Saint Lawrence is a cemetery church of medieval origin. It was rebuilt in the Neoclassical style in the 18th and 19th centuries.

References

External links

Villages in Mladá Boleslav District